William Edward Melody (January 13, 1850 – May 15, 1916) was an American politician from New York.

Life 
Melody was born on the West Side of Manhattan, New York City on January 13, 1850. His parents were Matthew Melody and Sabina O'Connor, Irish immigrants. When he was six months old, he moved with his parents to Tivoli, New York. Six years later, the family moved to Cincinnati, Ohio. After six months there, the family moved to Williamsburg, Brooklyn, where Melody lived ever since.

After finished school, Melody became a successful real estate dealer. In 1892, he was elected to the New York State Assembly as a Democrat, representing the Kings County 10th District. He served in the Assembly in 1893 and 1894. In 1900, he was appointed commissioner of jurors for Kings County. In 1902, he was elected Sheriff of Kings County, and served as sheriff in 1903. In 1906, he was appointed deputy collector of arrears. In 1908, he was appointed commissioner of public works.

Melody married Henrietta Hinck in 1896. They had a daughter, Dorothy. He was a member of the Benevolent and Protective Order of Elks.

Melody died in Bushwick Hospital on May 15, 1916, from intestinal trouble. He was buried in the Lutheran All Faiths Cemetery; although Melody was a Roman Catholic, his wife was a Lutheran.

References

External links 
The Political Graveyard

1850 births
1916 deaths
People from Williamsburg, Brooklyn
Sheriffs of Kings County, New York
Politicians from Brooklyn
American real estate brokers
American people of Irish descent
Democratic Party members of the New York State Assembly
Burials in New York (state)
Catholics from New York (state)
19th-century American politicians
20th-century American politicians
19th-century American businesspeople